The 2009 NCAA Division I Outdoor Track and Field Championships were contested at the 88th annual NCAA-sanctioned track meet to determine the individual and team champions of men's and women's Division I collegiate outdoor track and field in the United States.

This year's meet, the 28th with both men's and women's championships, was held June 10–13, 2009 at John McDonnell Field at the University of Arkansas in Fayetteville, Arkansas. 

Texas A&M won both the men's and women's titles, the Aggies' first at either event.

Team results 
 Note: Top 10 only
 (DC) = Defending champions
Full results

Men's standings

Women's standings

References

NCAA Men's Outdoor Track and Field Championship
NCAA Women's Outdoor Track and Field Championship
NCAA Division I Outdoor Track And Field Championships
NCAA Division I Outdoor Track And Field Championships